Pojana Maggiore is a town and comune in the province of Vicenza, Veneto, north-eastern Italy. It is the site of the UNESCO World Heritage Site Villa Pojana, designed by the Renaissance architect Andrea Palladio. The town has reputation for its agriculture.  It is bounded by the other communes of Noventa Vicentina and Montagnana.

Twin towns
Pojana Maggiore is twinned with:

  Roana, Italy, since 1996

References

Cities and towns in Veneto